Partridge Creek may refer to:

Partridge Creek (Michigan), a stream in Marquette County
Partridge Creek (Ontario), a creek in Hastings and Lennox & Addington counties

See also
The Mall at Partridge Creek, a shopping mall in Michigan